Göksun (Kykysós, or Κουκουσός, Koukousós; Latin: Coxon or Cucusus; Armenian: Կոկիսոն) is a town and district of Kahramanmaraş Province in the Mediterranean region of Turkey, near one of the sources of the Ceyhan River (ancient Pyramos),in the ancient region of Cataonia.

History 
Cucusus has an ancient history, first included in Cataonia, then in Cappadocia, and then in the Roman province of Armenia Secunda. The Byzantine bishops, Paul the Confessor (died 350 AD), John Chrysostom (died 407 AD) and Emperor Basiliscus (died 476 AD) either died in or were exiled to this remote place. Of its bishops, Domnus took part in the Council of Chalcedon (451), Longinus was a signatory of the joint letter of the bishops of the province of Armenia Secunda to  Byzantine Emperor Leo I the Thracian in 458 concerning the murder of Proterius of Alexandria, Ioannes was at the Second Council of Constantinople (553), and another Ioannes at the Trullan Council of 692. No longer a residential bishopric, Cucusus is today listed by the Catholic Church as a titular see.

In the mid-10th century the town received many Armenian immigrants and by 1097, when the army of the First Crusade marched arrived at Cucusus, they encountered a large prosperous town populated by Armenians. The town, most likely with its own wall, remained under control of the Armenian princes of Cilicia but was abandoned due to Türkmen raids around 1375, with its inhabitants taking refuge in the towns of Hadjin and Zeitun. After that, the town became part of the Beylik of Dulkadir before it was conquered by the Ottomans in 1515. In April 1915, the remaining Armenian population of Cucusus was deported during the Armenian Genocide.

2009 helicopter crash 

On March 25, 2009, a chartered helicopter carrying Great Union Party's (BBP) Muhsin Yazıcıoğlu, three of his party's local leaders, and a reporter crashed at Mount Keş. The pilot and all the passengers but the reporter were killed. Ismail Güneş, who initially survived, made an emergency call reporting the accident. A massive search and rescue operation, attended by thousands and assisted by helicopters and aircraft, was conducted. However, the wreckage and the five bodies were recovered only 47 hours later. The corpse of the reporter was found five days later far from the crash site.

References

Sources

External links 
  

Populated places in Kahramanmaraş Province
Districts of Kahramanmaraş Province
Towns in Turkey
Roman towns and cities in Turkey
Armenian Kingdom of Cilicia
Former Armenian inhabited settlements